Horsfieldia tomentosa is a species of plant in the family Myristicaceae. It is found in Sumatra, Peninsular Malaysia and Thailand.

References

tomentosa
Trees of Sumatra
Trees of Peninsular Malaysia
Trees of Thailand
Taxonomy articles created by Polbot